Gerald Häfner (born 3 November 1956 in Munich) is a German politician who served as an MEP for Alliance 90/The Greens between 2009 and 2014. He had three separate spells as a member of the Bundestag between 1987 and 2002 (1987-1990, 1994-1998 and 2001-2002). In 1980 he was one of the founding members of the Greens.

In addition to his committee assignments, Häfner was a member of the European Parliament's Advisory Committee on the Conduct of Members from 2012 until 2014.

References

1956 births
Living people
Politicians from Munich
Alliance 90/The Greens MEPs
Members of the Bundestag for Bavaria
Members of the Bundestag 1994–1998
MEPs for Germany 2009–2014
Members of the Bundestag for Alliance 90/The Greens